Bijan Koshki (born 24 June 1979, in Khorramabad) is an Iranian football player, who last played for Mes Kerman in IPL. He usually plays as a defender.

Club career
He started to impress in Pas and moved to Esteghlal in 2007.

Club career statistics

 Assist Goals

Honours

Club
Iran's Premier Football League
Winner: 1
2008–09 with Esteghlal
Runner up: 2
2005–06 with Pas Tehran
2010–11 with Esteghlal
Third Place: 1
2009–10 With Esteghlal
Hazfi Cup
Winner: 1
2007–08 with Esteghlal

References

Iranian footballers
Association football defenders
Pas players
Esteghlal F.C. players
Sanat Mes Kerman F.C. players
Living people
F.C. Aboomoslem players
People from Khorramabad
1979 births